This is a list of steamed foods and dishes that are typically or commonly prepared by the cooking method of steaming.

Steamed foods

 Ada – a food item from Kerala, usually made of rice flour with sweet filling inside.
 Bánh – in Hanoi Vietnamese, translates loosely as "cake" or "bread", referring to a wide variety of prepared foods. Some varieties are cooked by steaming.
 Bánh bò – a steamed sponge cake
 Bánh bột lọc 
 Bánh chuối hấp – literally "steamed banana cake"
 Bánh cuốn 
 Bánh da lợn – a steamed layer cake
 Bánh khoai mì hấp
 Bánh tẻ

 Chinese steamed eggs – eggs are beaten to a consistency similar to that used for an omelette and then steamed
 Corunda
 Couscous
 Dhokla
 Jjim – a Korean cuisine term referring to dishes made by steaming or boiling meat, chicken, fish, or shellfish which have been marinated in a sauce or soup
 Agujjim
 Andong jjimdak
 Galbijjim – a variety of jjim or Korean steamed dishes made with galbi (갈비, short rib)
 Gyeran jjim – a Korean steamed egg casserole, which is a popular dish in Korea and often eaten as a side dish (banchan)
 Kue lapis – Indonesian kue, or a traditional snack of colorful layered soft rice flour pudding or steamed layered cake
 Idli - a dish prepared from rice and black gram part of Udupi cuisine.
 Kwacoco – pureed cocoyam wrapped and steamed in banana leaves
 Lemper
 Nasi campur
 Nasi lemak – a fragrant rice dish cooked in coconut milk and pandan leaf commonly found in Malaysia, where it is considered the national dish, and the Riau Province of Indonesia.

 Pitha – some varieties are steamed
 Enduri Pitha
 Manda Pitha
 Tekeli pitha
Idiyappam / Putu mayam
 Puttu
 Rice noodle roll – a Cantonese dish from southern China including Hong Kong, commonly served either as a snack, small meal or as a variety of dim sum.
 Seon – refers to Korean traditional dishes made by steaming vegetables such as zucchini, cucumber, eggplant, or Napa cabbage that are stuffed with fillings
 Steamed rice
 Tamales – a Mexican and Central American dish of Pre-Columbian origins made with a corn-based dough and a variety of fillings, usually wrapped in banana leaf or corn husks
 Tofu skin roll – The bamboo steamed version is generally known as sin zuk gyun
 Urap

Breads

 Dombolo – a traditional South African steamed bread
 Mantou – a type of cloud-like steamed bread or bun popular in Northern China.
 Steamed bread – produced and consumed all around the world
 Tingmo – a steamed bread in Tibetan cuisine.
 Wotou – a type of steamed bread made from cornmeal in Northern China
Blackpool Milk roll Steamed bread roll originating in Blackpool Lancashire

Buns and rolls

 Bánh bao
 Baozi
 Bakpau
 Cha siu bao
 Goubuli
 Shengjian mantou
 Siopao
 Tangbao – large, soup-filled type of steamed buns in Chinese cuisine
 Xiaolongbao
 Da Bao
 Dampfnudel
 Hoppang
 Jjinppang
 Lotus seed bun
 Longevity peach
 Mandarin roll – a kind of steamed bun originating in China
 Nikuman

Cakes

 Bánh bèo
 Idli – cakes made by steaming a batter consisting of fermented black lentils (de-husked) and rice. Idli is a traditional breakfast in Indian households, and is also popular throughout India and neighbouring countries like Sri Lanka.
 Rava idli
 Khanom sai bua
 Kue putu – a traditional cylindrical-shaped and green-colored steamed cake. It is consumed in Indonesia, Malaysia, and the Philippines.
 Nagasari – a traditional steamed cake made from rice flour, coconut milk and sugar, filled with slices of banana.
 Nian gao
 Red tortoise cake
 Taro cake – typically steamed or fried
 Treacle sponge pudding – a traditional British dessert dish consisting of a steamed sponge cake with golden syrup cooked on top of it, often served with hot custard poured atop
 Turnip cake
 Uirō
 White sugar sponge cake

Confectionery and sweets

Mont-phat-htoke
 Karukan
 Kue and Kuih
 Clorot
 Kue mangkok
 Kue putu mangkok
 Seri Muka
 Lucky tattie
 Put chai ko

Custards

 Chawanmushi – (茶碗蒸し, Chawanmushi, literally "tea cup steam" or "steamed in a tea bowl"), an egg custard dish found in Japan.

Dumplings

 Burasa – a rice dumpling cooked with coconut milk packed inside a banana leaf pouch, it is a delicacy of the Bugis and Makassar people of South Sulawesi, Indonesia
 Buuz
 Germknödel
 Jiaozi
 Lepet
 Mandu (dumpling)
 Eomandu
 Momo (dumpling) – a type of steamed bun in Tibetan cuisine with or without filling
 Patrode
 Siomay – an Indonesian steamed fish dumpling with vegetables served in peanut sauce. It is derived from Chinese Shumai.

Meat-based

 Nasi tim – a Chinese-Indonesian steamed chicken rice dish
 Steamed cheeseburger – a hamburger sandwich topped with cheese that is steamed in a specially made cabinet and mainly available in the state of Connecticut in the United States
 Steamed clams – clams are steamed according to many different recipes in different regions
 Steamed meatball – a Cantonese dim sum dish

Puddings

 Cabinet pudding
 Chocolate pudding – a steamed/baked version, texturally similar to cake, is popular in the UK, Ireland, Australia, and New Zealand
 Custard – some custards are prepared by steaming
 Figgy pudding – sometimes cooked by steaming
 Moin moin
 Persimmon pudding
 Steak and kidney pudding
 Sticky toffee pudding
 Suet pudding
 Christmas pudding
 Fruit hat (pudding)
 Jam Roly-Poly
 Spotted dick – a cylindrical pudding popular in Britain, made with suet and dried fruit (usually currants and/or raisins) and often served with custard
 Sussex Pond Pudding

Rice cakes

Some varieties of rice cakes are steamed.
 Bánh chưng
 Chwee kueh – a type of steamed rice cake, a cuisine of Singapore and Johor
Mont-sein-paung – a type of steamed rice cake, sometimes with jaggery added, served with coconut flakes and pounded sesame. Found throughout Myanmar.
 Puto – a type of steamed rice cake in Philippine cuisine derived from Indian puttu of [Malayalam] origin.
 Kutsinta – a type of puto found throughout the Philippines
 Sanna (dish)
 Suman
 Tteok – also see List of tteok varieties
 Injeolmi
 Jeungpyeon
 Mujigae tteok
 Sirutteok
 Songpyeon
 Bhapa/ Tekeli pitha – Steamed rice cakes stuffed with grated coconut, jaggery and sesame seeds found throughout Bengal and Assam.

Gallery

See also

 Double steaming
 Food steamer
 List of deep fried foods
 List of twice-baked foods
 Pudding basin – a bowl or vessel that is specifically used to steam puddings

References

 
Steamed